Pediatric Radiology is a peer-reviewed medical journal covering all areas of pediatric imaging and related fields published by Springer Nature. It is the official journal of the European Society of Paediatric Radiology, Society for Pediatric Radiology, Asian and Oceanic Society for Pediatric Radiology, and the Latin American Society of Pediatric Radiology. The editors in chief are Professor Geetika Khanna (Atlanta, Georgia) and Professor Amaka C Offiah (Sheffield, UK).

Abstracting and indexing 
The journal is abstracted and indexed in Academic OneFile, Cengage, Proquest, Current Contents/Clinical Medicine, EBSCO databases, Embase, INIS Atomindex, PubMed/MEDLINE, Science Citation Index, Scopus, and Summon by Serial Solutions. According to the Journal Citation Reports, the journal has a 2021 impact factor of 3.005 .

External links
 
 European Society of Paediatric Radiology
 Society for Pediatric Radiology
 Asian and Oceanic Society for Pediatric Radiology
 Latin American Society of Pediatric Radiology (SLARP)

Pediatrics journals
Radiology and medical imaging journals
Springer Science+Business Media academic journals
Monthly journals
Publications established in 1973
English-language journals